In linguistics, a copula (plural: copulas or copulae; abbreviated ) is a word or phrase that links the subject of a sentence to a subject complement, such as the word is in the sentence "The sky is blue" or the phrase was not being in the sentence "It was not being co-operative." The word copula derives from the Latin noun for a "link" or "tie" that connects two different things.

A copula is often a verb or a verb-like word, though this is not universally the case. A verb that is a copula is sometimes called a copulative or copular verb. In English primary education grammar courses, a copula is often called a linking verb. In other languages, copulas show more resemblances to pronouns, as in Classical Chinese and Guarani, or may take the form of suffixes attached to a noun, as in Korean, Beja, and Inuit languages.

Most languages have one main copula (in English, the verb "to be"), although some (like Spanish, Portuguese and Thai) have more than one, while others have none. While the term copula is generally used to refer to such principal verbs, it may also be used for a wider group of verbs with similar potential functions (like become, get, feel and seem in English); alternatively, these might be distinguished as "semi-copulas" or "pseudo-copulas".

Grammatical function 
The principal use of a copula is to link the subject of a clause to a subject complement. A copular verb is often considered to be part of the predicate, the remainder being called a predicative expression. A simple clause containing a copula is illustrated below:

The book is on the table.

In that sentence, the noun phrase the book is the subject, the verb is serves as the copula, and the prepositional phrase on the table is the predicative expression. The whole expression is on the table may (in some theories of grammar) be called a predicate or a verb phrase.

The predicative expression accompanying the copula, also known as the complement of the copula, may take any of several possible forms: it may be a noun or noun phrase, an adjective or adjective phrase, a prepositional phrase (as above) or an adverb or another adverbial phrase expressing time or location. Examples are given below (with the copula in bold and the predicative expression in italics):

The three components (subject, copula and predicative expression) do not necessarily appear in that order: their positioning depends on the rules for word order applicable to the language in question. In English (an SVO language), the ordering given above is the normal one, but certain variation is possible:
In many questions and other clauses with subject–auxiliary inversion, the copula moves in front of the subject: Are you happy?
In inverse copular constructions (see below) the predicative expression precedes the copula, but the subject follows it: In the room were three men.

It is also possible, in certain circumstances, for one (or even two) of the three components to be absent:
In null-subject (pro-drop) languages, the subject may be omitted, as it may from other types of sentence. In Italian,  means ‘I am tired’, literally ‘am tired’.
In non-finite clauses in languages like English, the subject is often absent, as in the participial phrase being tired or the infinitive phrase to be tired. The same applies to most imperative sentences like Be good!
Any of the three components may be omitted as a result of various general types of ellipsis. In particular, in English, the predicative expression may be elided in a construction similar to verb phrase ellipsis, as in short sentences like I am; Are they? (where the predicative expression is understood from the previous context).

Inverse copular constructions, in which the positions of the predicative expression and the subject are reversed, are found in various languages. They have been the subject of much theoretical analysis, particularly in regard to the difficulty of maintaining, in the case of such sentences, the usual division into a subject noun phrase and a predicate verb phrase.

Another issue is verb agreement when both subject and predicative expression are noun phrases (and differ in number or person): in English, the copula typically agrees with the syntactical subject even if it is not logically (i.e. semantically) the subject, as in the cause of the riot is (not are) these pictures of the wall. Compare Italian ; notice the use of the plural  to agree with plural  "these photos" rather than with singular  "the cause". In instances where an English syntactical subject comprises a prepositional object that is pluralized, however, the prepositional object agrees with the predicative expression, e.g. "What kind of birds are those?"

The definition and scope of the concept of a copula is not necessarily precise in any language. As noted above, though the concept of the copula in English is most strongly associated with the verb to be, there are many other verbs that can be used in a copular sense as well.
 The boy became a man.
 The girl grew more excited as the holiday preparations intensified.
 The dog felt tired from the activity.

And more tenuously
 The milk turned sour.
 The food smells good.
 You seem upset.

Meanings 
Predicates formed using a copula may express identity: that the two noun phrases (subject and complement) have the same referent or express an identical concept:

They may also express membership of a class or a subset relationship:

Similarly they may express some property, relation or position, permanent or temporary:

Other special uses of copular verbs are described in some of the following sections.

Essence vs. state 
Some languages use different copulas, or different syntax, to denote a permanent, essential characteristic of something versus a temporary state. For examples, see the sections on the Romance languages, Slavic languages and Irish.

Forms 
In many languages the principal copula is a verb, like English (to) be, German , Mixtec , Touareg emous, etc. It may inflect for grammatical categories like tense, aspect and mood, like other verbs in the language. Being a very commonly used verb, it is likely that the copula has irregular inflected forms; in English, the verb be has a number of highly irregular (suppletive) forms and has more different inflected forms than any other English verb (am, is, are, was, were, etc.; see English verbs for details).

Other copulas show more resemblances to pronouns. That is the case for Classical Chinese and Guarani, for instance. In highly synthetic languages, copulas are often suffixes, attached to a noun, but they may still behave otherwise like ordinary verbs:  in Inuit languages.

In some other languages, like Beja and Ket, the copula takes the form of suffixes that attach to a noun but are distinct from the person agreement markers used on predicative verbs. This phenomenon is known as nonverbal person agreement (or nonverbal subject agreement), and the relevant markers are always established as deriving from cliticized independent pronouns.

Additional uses of copular verbs 
A copular verb may also have other uses supplementary to or distinct from its uses as a copula.

As auxiliary verbs 
The English verb to be is also used as an auxiliary verb, especially for expressing passive voice (together with the past participle) or expressing progressive aspect (together with the present participle):

Other languages' copulas have additional uses as auxiliaries. For example, French  can be used to express passive voice similarly to English be; both French  and German  are used to express the perfect forms of certain verbs (formerly English be was also):

The auxiliary functions of these verbs derived from their copular function, and could be interpreted as special cases of the copular function (with the verbal forms it precedes being considered adjectival).

Another auxiliary usage in English is (together with the to-infinitive) to denote an obligatory action or expected occurrence: "I am to serve you;" "The manager is to resign." This can be put also into past tense: "We were to leave at 9." For forms like "if I was/were to come," see English conditional sentences. (By certain criteria, the English copula be may always be considered an auxiliary verb; see Diagnostics for identifying auxiliary verbs in English.)

Existential usage 
The English to be and its equivalents in certain other languages also have a non-copular use as an existential verb, meaning "to exist." This use is illustrated in the following sentences: I want only to be, and that is enough; I think therefore I am; To be or not to be, that is the question. In these cases, the verb itself expresses a predicate (that of existence), rather than linking to a predicative expression as it does when used as a copula. In ontology it is sometimes suggested that the "is" of existence is reducible to the "is" of property attribution or class membership; to be, Aristotle held, is to be something. However, Abelard in his Dialectica made a reductio ad absurdum argument against the idea that the copula can express existence.

However, other languages prefer a different verb for existential use, as in the Spanish version  (where the verb  "to exist" is used rather than the copula  or  ‘to be’).

Another type of existential usage is in clauses of the there is… or there are… type. Languages differ in the way they express such meanings; some of them use the copular verb, possibly with an expletive pronoun like the English there, while other languages use different verbs and constructions, like the French  (which uses parts of the verb  ‘to have,’ not the copula) or the Swedish  (the passive voice of the verb for "to find"). For details, see existential clause.

Relying on a unified theory of copular sentences, it has been proposed that the English there-sentences are subtypes of inverse copular constructions.

Zero copula 

In some languages, copula omission occurs within a particular grammatical context. For example, speakers of Russian, Indonesian, Turkish, Hungarian, Arabic, Hebrew, Geʽez and Quechuan languages consistently drop the copula in present tense: Russian: ,  ‘I (am a) person;’ Indonesian:  ‘I (am) a human;’ Turkish:  ‘s/he (is a) human;’ Hungarian:  ‘s/he (is) a human;’ Arabic: أنا إنسان,  ‘I (am a) human;’ Hebrew: אני אדם, ʔani ʔadam "I (am a) human;" Geʽez: አነ ብእሲ/ብእሲ አነ ʔana bəʔəsi / bəʔəsi ʔana "I (am a) man" / "(a) man I (am)"; Southern Quechua: payqa runam "s/he (is) a human."  The usage is known generically as the zero copula. In other tenses (sometimes in forms other than third person singular), the copula usually reappears.

Some languages drop the copula in poetic or aphorismic contexts. Examples in English include
 The more, the better.
 Out of many, one.
 True that.
Such poetic copula dropping is more pronounced in some languages other than English, like the Romance languages.

In informal speech of English, the copula may also be dropped in general sentences, as in "She a nurse." It is a feature of African-American Vernacular English, but is also used by a variety of other English speakers. An example is the sentence "I saw twelve men, each a soldier."

Examples in specific languages 
In Ancient Greek, when an adjective precedes a noun with an article, the copula is understood: , "the house is large," can be written , "large the house (is)."

In Quechua (Southern Quechua used for the examples), zero copula is restricted to present tense in third person singular (kan): Payqa runam  — "(s)he is a human;" but: (paykuna) runakunam kanku "(they) are human."ap

In Māori, the zero copula can be used in predicative expressions and with continuous verbs (many of which take a copulative verb in many Indo-European languages) — He nui te whare, literally "a big the house," "the house (is) big;" I te tēpu te pukapuka, literally "at (past locative particle) the table the book," "the book (was) on the table;" Nō Ingarangi ia, literally "from England (s)he," "(s)he (is) from England," Kei te kai au, literally "at the (act of) eating I," "I (am) eating."

Alternatively, in many cases, the particle ko can be used as a copulative (though not all instances of ko are used as thus, like all other Maori particles, ko has multiple purposes): Ko nui te whare "The house is big;" Ko te pukapuka kei te tēpu "It is the book (that is) on the table;" Ko au kei te kai "It is me eating."

However, when expressing identity or class membership, ko must be used: Ko tēnei tāku pukapuka "This is my book;" Ko Ōtautahi he tāone i Te Waipounamu "Christchurch is a city in the South Island (of New Zealand);" Ko koe tōku hoa "You are my friend."

When expressing identity, ko can be placed on either object in the clause without changing the meaning (ko tēnei tāku pukapuka is the same as ko tāku pukapuka tēnei) but not on both (ko tēnei ko tāku pukapuka would be equivalent to saying "it is this, it is my book" in English).

In Hungarian, zero copula is restricted to present tense in third person singular and plural: Ő ember/Ők emberek — "s/he is a human"/"they are humans;" but: (én) ember vagyok "I am a human," (te) ember vagy "you are a human," mi emberek vagyunk "we are humans," (ti) emberek vagytok "you (all) are humans." The copula also reappears for stating locations: az emberek a házban vannak, "the people are in the house," and for stating time: hat óra van, "it is six o'clock." However, the copula may be omitted in colloquial language: hat óra (van), "it is six o'clock."

Hungarian uses copula lenni for expressing location: Itt van Róbert "Bob is here," but it is omitted in the third person present tense for attribution or identity statements: Róbert öreg "Bob is old;" ők éhesek "They are hungry;" Kati nyelvtudós "Cathy is a linguist" (but Róbert öreg volt "Bob was old," éhesek voltak "They were hungry," Kati nyelvtudós volt "Cathy was a linguist).

In Turkish, both the third person singular and the third person plural copulas are omittable. Ali burada and Ali buradadır both mean "Ali is here," and Onlar aç and Onlar açlar both mean "They are hungry." Both of the sentences are acceptable and grammatically correct, but sentences with the copula are more formal.

The Turkish first person singular copula suffix is omitted when introducing oneself. Bora ben (I am Bora) is grammatically correct, but "Bora benim" (same sentence with the copula) is not for an introduction (but is grammatically correct in other cases).

Further restrictions may apply before omission is permitted. For example, in the Irish language, is, the present tense of the copula, may be omitted when the predicate is a noun. Ba, the past/conditional, cannot be deleted. If the present copula is omitted, the pronoun (e.g., é, í, iad) preceding the noun is omitted as well.

Additional copulas 
Sometimes, the term copula is taken to include not only a language's equivalent(s) to the verb be but also other verbs or forms that serve to link a subject to a predicative expression (while adding semantic content of their own). For example, English verbs like become, get, feel, look, taste, smell, and seem can have this function, as in the following sentences (the predicative expression, the complement of the verb, is in italics):

(This usage should be distinguished from the use of some of these verbs as "action" verbs, as in They look at the wall, in which look denotes an action and cannot be replaced by the basic copula are.)

Some verbs have rarer, secondary uses as copular verbs, like the verb fall in sentences like The zebra fell victim to the lion.

These extra copulas are sometimes called "semi-copulas" or "pseudo-copulas." For a list of common verbs of this type in English, see List of English copulae.

In particular languages

Indo-European 

In Indo-European languages, the words meaning to be are sometimes similar to each other. Due to the high frequency of their use, their inflection retains a considerable degree of similarity in some cases. Thus, for example, the English form is is a cognate of German ist, Latin est, Persian ast and Russian jest', even though the Germanic, Italic, Iranian and Slavic language groups split at least 3000 years ago. The origins of the copulas of most Indo-European languages can be traced back to four Proto-Indo-European stems: *es- (*h1es-), *sta- (*steh2-), *wes- and *bhu- (*bʰuH-).

English 

The English copular verb be has eight forms (more than any other English verb): be, am, is, are, being, was, were, been. Additional archaic forms include art, wast, wert, and occasionally beest (as a subjunctive). For more details see English verbs. For the etymology of the various forms, see Indo-European copula.

The main uses of the copula in English are described in the above sections. The possibility of copula omission is mentioned under .

A particular construction found in English (particularly in speech) is the use of two successive copulas when only one appears necessary, as in My point is, is that.... The acceptability of this construction is a disputed matter in English prescriptive grammar.

The simple English copula "be" may on occasion be substituted by other verbs with near identical meanings.

Persian 
In Persian, the verb to be can either take the form of ast (cognate to English is) or budan (cognate to be).

{| border="0" cellspacing="2" cellpadding="1"
|-
| Aseman abi ast.
|آسمان آبی است
| the sky is blue
|-
| Aseman abi khahad bood.
|آسمان آبی خواهد بود
| the sky will be blue
|-
| Aseman abi bood.
|آسمان آبی بود
| the sky was blue

|}

Hindustani 
In Hindustani (Hindi and Urdu), the copula होना ɦonɑ ہونا can be put into four grammatical aspects (simple, habitual, perfective, and progressive) and each of those four aspects can be put into five grammatical moods (indicative, presumptive, subjunctive, contrafactual, and imperative). Some example sentences using the simple aspect are shown below:

Besides the verb होना honā  (to be), there are three other verbs which can also be used as the copula, they are रहना rêhnā  (to stay), जाना jānā  (to go), and आना ānā  (to come). The following table shows the conjugations of the copula होना honā  in the five grammatical moods in the simple aspect. The transliteration scheme used is ISO 15919.

Romance 

Copulas in the Romance languages usually consist of two different verbs that can be translated as "to be," the main one from the Latin esse (via Vulgar Latin essere; esse deriving from *es-), often referenced as sum (another of the Latin verb's principal parts) and a secondary one from stare (from *sta-), often referenced as sto. The resulting distinction in the modern forms is found in all the Iberian Romance languages, and to a lesser extent Italian, but not in French or Romanian. The difference is that the first usually refers to essential characteristics, while the second refers to states and situations, e.g., "Bob is old" versus "Bob is well." A similar division is found in the non-Romance Basque language (viz. egon and izan). (The English words just used, "essential" and "state," are also cognate with the Latin infinitives esse and stare. The word "stay" also comes from Latin stare, through Middle French estai, stem of Old French ester.) In Spanish and Portuguese, the high degree of verbal inflection, plus the existence of two copulas (ser and estar), means that there are 105 (Spanish) and 110 (Portuguese) separate forms to express the copula, compared to eight in English and one in Chinese.

In some cases, the verb itself changes the meaning of the adjective/sentence. The following examples are from Portuguese:

Slavic 
Some Slavic languages make a distinction between essence and state (similar to that discussed in the above section on the Romance languages), by putting a predicative expression denoting a state into the instrumental case, and essential characteristics are in the nominative. This can apply with other copula verbs as well: the verbs for "become" are normally used with the instrumental case.

As noted above under , Russian and other East Slavic languages generally omit the copula in the present tense.

Irish 
In Irish and Scottish Gaelic, there are two copulas, and the syntax is also changed when one is distinguishing between states or situations and essential characteristics.

Describing the subject's state or situation typically uses the normal VSO ordering with the verb bí. The copula is is used to state essential characteristics or equivalences.

{| border="0" cellspacing="2" cellpadding="1" valign="top"
| align=left valign=top|  || align=right valign=top |  || align=left valign=top |
|-
|Is fear é Liam.|| "Liam is a man." ||(Lit., "Is man Liam.")
|-
|Is leabhar é sin.|| "That is a book." ||(Lit., "Is book it that.")
|}

The word is is the copula (rhymes with the English word "miss").

The pronoun used with the copula is different from the normal pronoun. For a masculine singular noun, é is used (for "he" or "it"), as opposed to the normal pronoun sé; for a feminine singular noun, í is used (for "she" or "it"), as opposed to normal pronoun sí; for plural nouns, iad is used (for "they" or "those"), as opposed to the normal pronoun siad.

To describe being in a state, condition, place, or act, the verb "to be" is used: Tá mé ag rith. "I am running."

Arabic dialects

North Levantine Arabic 

Bantu languages

Chichewa 

In Chichewa, a Bantu language spoken mainly in Malawi, a very similar distinction exists between permanent and temporary states as in Spanish and Portuguese, but only in the present tense. For a permanent state, in the 3rd person, the copula used in the present tense is ndi (negative sí):
iyé ndi mphunzitsi "he is a teacher"
iyé sí mphunzitsi "he is not a teacher"

For the 1st and 2nd persons the particle ndi is combined with pronouns, e.g. ine "I":
ine ndine mphunzitsi "I am a teacher"
iwe ndiwe mphunzitsi "you (singular) are a teacher"
ine síndine mphunzitsi "I am not a teacher"

For temporary states and location, the copula is the appropriate form of the defective verb -li:
iyé ali bwino "he is well"
iyé sáli bwino "he is not well"
iyé ali ku nyumbá "he is in the house"

For the 1st and 2nd persons the person is shown, as normally with Chichewa verbs, by the appropriate pronominal prefix:
ine ndili bwino "I am well"
iwe uli bwino "you (sg.) are well"
kunyumbá kuli bwino "at home (everything) is fine"

In the past tenses, -li is used for both types of copula:
iyé analí bwino "he was well (this morning)"
iyé ánaalí mphunzitsi "he was a teacher (at that time)"

In the future, subjunctive, or conditional tenses, a form of the verb khala ("sit/dwell") is used as a copula:
máwa ákhala bwino "he'll be fine tomorrow"

Muylaq' Aymaran 

Uniquely, the existence of the copulative verbalizer suffix in the Southern Peruvian Aymaran language variety, Muylaq' Aymara, is evident only in the surfacing of a vowel that would otherwise have been deleted because of the presence of a following suffix, lexically prespecified to suppress it. As the copulative verbalizer has no independent phonetic structure, it is represented by the Greek letter ʋ in the examples used in this entry.

Accordingly, unlike in most other Aymaran variants, whose copulative verbalizer is expressed with a vowel-lengthening component, -:, the presence of the copulative verbalizer in Muylaq' Aymara is often not apparent on the surface at all and is analyzed as existing only meta-linguistically. However, in a verb phrase like "It is old," the noun thantha meaning "old" does not require the copulative verbalizer, thantha-wa "It is old."

It is now pertinent to make some observations about the distribution of the copulative verbalizer. The best place to start is with words in which its presence or absence is obvious. When the vowel-suppressing first person simple tense suffix attaches to a verb, the vowel of the immediately preceding suffix is suppressed (in the examples in this subsection, the subscript "c" appears prior to vowel-suppressing suffixes in the interlinear gloss to better distinguish instances of deletion that arise from the presence of a lexically pre-specified suffix from those that arise from other (e.g. phonotactic) motivations). Consider the verb sara- which is inflected for the first person simple tense and so, predictably, loses its final root vowel: sar(a)-ct-wa "I go."

However, prior to the suffixation of the first person simple suffix -ct to the same root nominalized with the agentive nominalizer -iri, the word must be verbalized. The fact that the final vowel of -iri below is not suppressed indicates the presence of an intervening segment, the copulative verbalizer: sar(a)-iri-ʋ-t-wa "I usually go."

It is worthwhile to compare of the copulative verbalizer in Muylaq' Aymara as compared to La Paz Aymara, a variant which represents this suffix with vowel lengthening. Consider the near-identical sentences below, both translations of "I have a small house" in which the nominal root uta-ni "house-attributive" is verbalized with the copulative verbalizer, but the correspondence between the copulative verbalizer in these two variants is not always a strict one-to-one relation.

{| border="0" cellspacing="2" cellpadding="1"
| align=left |  || align=right |  || align=left |
|-
| La Paz Aymara:
|ma: jisk'a uta-ni-:-ct(a)-wa
|-
| Muylaq' Aymara:
|ma isk'a uta-ni-ʋ-ct-wa
|}

Georgian 
As in English, the verb "to be" (qopna) is irregular in Georgian (a Kartvelian language); different verb roots are employed in different tenses. The roots -ar-, -kn-, -qav-, and -qop- (past participle) are used in the present tense, future tense, past tense and the perfective tenses respectively. Examples:

{| border="0" cellspacing="2" cellpadding="1"
| align=left |  || align=right |  || align=left |
|-
| Masc'avlebeli var.
| "I am a teacher."
|-
| Masc'avlebeli viknebi.
| "I will be a teacher."
|-
| Masc'avlebeli viqavi.
| "I was a teacher."
|-
| Masc'avlebeli vqopilvar.
| "I have been a teacher."
|-
| Masc'avlebeli vqopiliqavi.
| "I had been a teacher."
|}

In the last two examples (perfective and pluperfect), two roots are used in one verb compound. In the perfective tense, the root qop (which is the expected root for the perfective tense) is followed by the root ar, which is the root for the present tense. In the pluperfective tense, again, the root qop is followed by the past tense root qav. This formation is very similar to German (an Indo-European language), where the perfect and the pluperfect are expressed in the following way:

{| border="0" cellspacing="2" cellpadding="1"
| align=left |  || align=right |  || align=left |
|-
| Ich bin Lehrer gewesen.
| "I have been a teacher," literally "I am teacher been."
|-
| Ich war Lehrer gewesen.
| "I had been a teacher," literally "I was teacher been."
|}

Here, gewesen is the past participle of sein ("to be") in German. In both examples, as in Georgian, this participle is used together with the present and the past forms of the verb in order to conjugate for the perfect and the pluperfect aspects.

Haitian Creole 
Haitian Creole, a French-based creole language, has three forms of the copula: se, ye, and the zero copula, no word at all (the position of which will be indicated with Ø, just for purposes of illustration).

The use of a zero copula is unknown in French, and it is thought to be an innovation from the early days when Haitian-Creole was first developing as a Romance-based pidgin.  Latin also sometimes used a zero copula.

Which of se / ye / Ø is used in any given copula clause depends on complex syntactic factors that we can superficially summarize in the following four rules:

1. Use Ø (i.e., no word at all) in declarative sentences where the complement is an adjective phrase, prepositional phrase, or adverb phrase:

{| border="0" cellspacing="2" cellpadding="1"
| align=left |  || align=right |  || align=left |
|-
| Li te Ø an Ayiti.
| "She was in Haiti." || (Lit., "She past-tense in Haiti.")
|-
| Liv-la Ø jon.
| "The book is yellow." || (Lit., "Book-the yellow.")
|-
| Timoun-yo Ø lakay.
| "The kids are [at] home." || (Lit., "Kids-the home.")
|}

2. Use se when the complement is a noun phrase.  But, whereas other verbs come after any tense/mood/aspect particles (like pa to mark negation, or te to explicitly mark past tense, or ap to mark progressive aspect), se comes before any such particles:

{| border="0" cellspacing="2" cellpadding="1"
| align=left |  || align=right |  || align=left |
|-
| Chal se ekriven.
| "Charles is writer."
|-
| Chal, ki se ekriven, pa vini.
| "Charles, who is writer, not come."
|}

3. Use se where French and English have a dummy "it" subject:

{| border="0" cellspacing="2" cellpadding="1"
| align=left |  || align=right |  || align=left |
|-
| Se mwen!
| "It's me!" French C'est moi!
|-
| Se pa fasil.
| "It's not easy," colloquial French C'est pas facile.
|}

4. Finally, use the other copula form ye in situations where the sentence's syntax leaves the copula at the end of a phrase:

{| border="0" cellspacing="2" cellpadding="1"
| align=left |  || align=right |  || align=left |
|-
| Kijan ou ye?
| "How you are?"
|-
| Pou kimoun liv-la te ye?
| "Whose book was it?" || (Lit., "Of who book-the past-tense is?)
|-
| M pa konnen kimoun li ye.
| "I don't know who he is." || (Lit., "I not know who he is.")
|-
| Se yon ekriven Chal ye.
| "Charles is a writer!" || (Lit., "It's a writer Charles is;" cf. French C'est un écrivain qu'il est.)
|}

The above is, however, only a simplified analysis.

Japanese 

The Japanese copula (most often translated into English as an inflected form of "to be") has many forms. E.g., The form da is used predicatively, na – attributively, de – adverbially or as a connector, and desu – predicatively or as a politeness indicator.

Examples:

{| border="0" cellspacing="2" cellpadding="1"
| align=left |  || align=right |  || align=left |
|-
| 私は学生だ。
| Watashi wa gakusei da. || "I'm a student." || (lit., I TOPIC student COPULA)
|-
| これはペンです。
| Kore wa pen desu. || "This is a pen." || (lit., this TOPIC pen COPULA-POLITE)
|}

Desu is the polite form of the copula. Thus, many sentences like the ones below are almost identical in meaning and differ only in the speaker's politeness to the addressee and in nuance of how assured the person is of their statement.

{| border="0" cellspacing="2" cellpadding="1"
| align=left |  || align=right |  || align=left |
|-
| あれはホテルだ。
| Are wa hoteru da.|| "That's a hotel." || (lit., that TOPIC hotel COPULA)
|-
| あれはホテルです。
| Are wa hoteru desu.|| "That is a hotel." || (lit., that TOPIC hotel COPULA-POLITE)
|}

A predicate in Japanese is expressed by the predicative form of a verb, the predicative form of an adjective or noun + the predicative form of a copula.

{| border="0" cellspacing="2" cellpadding="1"
| align=left |  || align=right |  || align=left |
|-
| このビールはおいしい。
| Kono bīru wa oishii. || "This beer is delicious."
|-
| このビールはおいしいです。
| Kono bīru wa oishii desu. || "This beer is delicious."
|-
| *このビールはおいしいだ。
| *Kono bīru wa oishii da. || colspan=2 | This is grammatically incorrect because da can only be coupled with a noun to form a predicate.
|}

Other forms of copula:

である de aru, であります de arimasu (used in writing and formal speaking)
でございます de gozaimasu (used in public announcements, notices, etc.)

The copula is subject to dialectal variation throughout Japan, resulting in forms like や ya in Kansai and じゃ ja in Hiroshima (see map above).

Japanese also has two verbs corresponding to English "to be": aru and iru. They are not copulas but existential verbs. Aru is used for inanimate objects, including plants, whereas iru is used for animate things like people, animals, and robots, though there are exceptions to this generalization.

{| border="0" cellspacing="2" cellpadding="1"
| align=left |  || align=right |  || align=left |
|-
| 本はテーブルにある。
| Hon wa tēburu ni aru.|| "The book is on a table."
|-
| 小林さんはここにいる。
| Kobayashi-san wa koko ni iru.|| "Kobayashi is here."
|}

Japanese speakers, when learning English, often drop the auxiliary verbs "be" and "do," incorrectly believing that "be" is a semantically empty copula equivalent to "desu" and "da."

Korean 
For sentences with predicate nominatives, the copula "이" (i-) is added to the predicate nominative (with no space in between).

{| border="0" cellspacing="2" cellpadding="1"
| align=left |  || align=right |  || align=left |
|-
| 바나나는 과일이다.
| Ba-na-na-neun gwa-il-i-da. || "Bananas are a fruit."
|}

Some adjectives (usually colour adjectives) are nominalized and used with the copula "이"(i-).

1. Without the copula "이"(i-):

{| border="0" cellspacing="2" cellpadding="1"
| align=left |  || align=right |  || align=left |
|-
| 장미는 빨개요.
| Jang-mi-neun ppal-gae-yo.|| "Roses are red."
|}

2. With the copula "이"(i-):

{| border="0" cellspacing="2" cellpadding="1"
| align=left |  || align=right |  || align=left |
|-
| 장미는 빨간색이다.
| Jang-mi-neun ppal-gan-saek-i-da.|| "Roses are red-coloured."
|}

Some Korean adjectives are derived using the copula. Separating these articles and nominalizing the former part will often result in a sentence with a related, but different meaning. Using the separated sentence in a situation where the un-separated sentence is appropriate is usually acceptable as the listener can decide what the speaker is trying to say using the context.

Chinese 
N.B. The characters used are simplified ones, and the transcriptions given in italics reflect Standard Chinese pronunciation, using the pinyin system.

In Chinese, both states and qualities are, in general, expressed with stative verbs (SV) with no need for a copula, e.g., in Chinese, "to be tired" (累 lèi), "to be hungry" (饿 è), "to be located at" (在 zài), "to be stupid" (笨 bèn) and so forth. A sentence can consist simply of a pronoun and such a verb: for example, 我饿 wǒ è ("I am hungry"). Usually, however, verbs expressing qualities are qualified by an adverb (meaning "very," "not," "quite," etc.); when not otherwise qualified, they are often preceded by 很 hěn, which in other contexts means "very," but in this use often has no particular meaning.

Only sentences with a noun as the complement (e.g., "This is my sister") use the copular verb "to be": . This is used frequently; for example, instead of having a verb meaning "to be Chinese," the usual expression is "to be a Chinese person" ("I am a Chinese person;" "I am Chinese"). This  is sometimes called an equative verb. Another possibility is for the complement to be just a noun modifier (ending in ), the noun being omitted: 

Before the Han Dynasty, the character 是 served as a demonstrative pronoun meaning "this." (This usage survives in some idioms and proverbs.) Some linguists believe that 是 developed into a copula because it often appeared, as a repetitive subject, after the subject of a sentence (in classical Chinese we can say, for example: "George W. Bush, this president of the United States" meaning "George W. Bush is the president of the United States). The character 是 appears to be formed as a compound of characters with the meanings of "early" and "straight."

Another use of 是 in modern Chinese is in combination with the modifier 的 de to mean "yes" or to show agreement. For example: Question: 你的汽车是不是红色的？ nǐ de qìchē shì bú shì hóngsè de? "Is your car red or not?"Response: 是的 shì de "Is," meaning "Yes," or 不是 bú shì "Not is," meaning "No." (A more common way of showing that the person asking the question is correct is by simply saying "right" or "correct," 对 duì; the corresponding negative answer is 不对 bú duì, "not right.")

Yet another use of 是 is in the shì...(de) construction, which is used to emphasize a particular element of the sentence; see .

In Hokkien 是 sī acts as the copula, and 是  is the equivalent in Wu Chinese. Cantonese uses 係 instead of 是; similarly, Hakka uses 係 he55.

Siouan languages
In Siouan languages like Lakota, in principle almost all words—according to their structure—are verbs. So not only (transitive, intransitive and so-called "stative") verbs but even nouns often behave like verbs and do not need to have copulas.

For example, the word wičháša refers to a man, and the verb "to-be-a-man" is expressed as wimáčhaša/winíčhaša/wičháša (I am/you are/he is a man). Yet there also is a copula héčha (to be a ...) that in most cases is used: wičháša hemáčha/heníčha/héčha (I am/you are/he is a man).

In order to express the statement "I am a doctor of profession," one has to say pezuta wičháša hemáčha. But, in order to express that that person is THE doctor (say, that had been phoned to help), one must use another copula iyé (to be the one): pežúta wičháša (kiŋ) miyé yeló (medicine-man DEF ART I-am-the-one MALE ASSERT).

In order to refer to space (e.g., Robert is in the house), various verbs are used, e.g., yaŋkÁ (lit., to sit) for humans, or háŋ/hé (to stand upright) for inanimate objects of a certain shape. "Robert is in the house" could be translated as Robert thimáhel yaŋké (yeló), whereas "There's one restaurant next to the gas station" translates as Owótethipi wígli-oínažiŋ kiŋ hél isákhib waŋ hé.

Constructed languages 
The constructed language Lojban has two words that act similar to a copula in natural languages. The clause me ... me'u turns whatever follows it into a predicate that means to be (among) what it follows. For example, me la .bob. (me'u) means "to be Bob," and me le ci mensi (me'u) means "to be one of the three sisters." Another one is du, which is itself a predicate that means all its arguments are the same thing (equal). One word which is often confused for a copula in Lojban, but isn't one, is cu. It merely indicates that the word which follows is the main predicate of the sentence. For example, lo pendo be mi cu zgipre means "my friend is a musician," but the word cu does not correspond to English is; instead, the word zgipre, which is a predicate, corresponds to the entire phrase "is a musician". The word cu is used to prevent lo pendo be mi zgipre, which would mean "the friend-of-me type of musician".

See also 
 Indo-European copula
 Nominal sentence
 Stative verb
 Subject complement
 Zero copula

Citations

General references 

 
 
  (See "copular sentences" and "existential sentences and expletive there" in Volume II.)
 
 
 Moro, A. (1997) The Raising of Predicates. Cambridge University Press, Cambridge, England.
 
 Tüting, A. W. (December 2003). Essay on Lakota syntax. .

Further reading

External links 

Parts of speech
Verb types